The discography of Stone Temple Pilots, an American rock band, consists of 8 studio albums, 3 compilation albums, 2 live albums, 1 extended play, 34 singles and 22 music videos.

Albums

Studio albums

EPs (mini-albums)

Compilation albums

Live albums

Singles

Promotional singles

Music videos

Notes

References

Rock music group discographies
Discographies of American artists
Discography